Lewis James Thorpe (born 23 November 1995) is an Australian professional baseball pitcher who is a free agent. He has played in Major League Baseball (MLB) for the Minnesota Twins.

Amateur career
As an amateur, Thorpe trained at the Melbourne Aces Baseball Academy. He competed in international youth baseball tournaments. In 2011, Thorpe won the "Golden Arm" award from the Australian Baseball Federation. In 2012, he signed with the Minnesota Twins, receiving a $500,000 signing bonus.

Professional career

Minnesota Twins
In the 2013 season, Thorpe made his professional debut with the Gulf Coast Twins of the Rookie-level Gulf Coast League (GCL). He pitched to a 4–1 win–loss record and a 2.05 earned run average (ERA) in 44 innings pitched, and a GCL-leading 64 strikeouts. He pitched in the 2013 18U Baseball World Cup after the season for the Australian national baseball team. He pitched Australia to victory against the United States national baseball team, the only game the United States lost. After the season, Baseball America named him the seventh-best prospect in the GCL. Thorpe made his Australian Baseball League debut with the Aces on 22 November 2013.

After participating in extended spring training, the Twins assigned Thorpe to the Cedar Rapids Kernels of the Class A Midwest League in June 2014, where he became the youngest player in the league. He finished the year with a 3–2 win–loss record and a 3.52 ERA in 16 games started. At the end of the 2014 season, Thorpe was diagnosed with a sprained ulnar collateral ligament (UCL) in his pitching elbow. He underwent Tommy John surgery to repair the injury in March 2015, causing him to miss all of 2015 and 2016. Thorpe returned in 2017 and spent time with both the Fort Myers Miracle of the Class A-Advanced Florida State League and the Chattanooga Lookouts of the Class AA Southern League, pitching to a combined 4-4 record and 2.93 ERA in 17 total games (16 starts) between the two teams. The Twins added him to their 40-man roster after the season. Thorpe returned to Chattanooga in 2018, and was selected to represent the Twins in the All-Star Futures Game.

On 28 June 2019, the Twins promoted Thorpe to MLB. On 30 June, he made his MLB debut.

On 29 June 2020, Thorpe made the Twins 60-man summer camp roster in 2020. He made the Twins Opening Day roster in 2020. In 2020, Thorpe registered a 6.06 ERA with 10 strikeouts in 16.1 innings pitched. In 2021, Thorpe made 13 total appearances between Minnesota and the Triple-A St. Paul Saints. In 5 appearances for the big league club, logging a 4.70 ERA with 6 strikeouts in 15.1 innings of work. 

In spring training in 2022, the Twins transitioned Thorpe to a relief pitcher. On 28 March 2022, the Twins sent Thorpe outright to the St. Paul Saints of the Triple-A International League, removing him from their 40-man roster to make room for the newly-signed Chris Archer. On 21 April 2022, the Twins released Thorpe, making him a free agent.

Kansas City Monarchs
On 5 May 2022, Thorpe signed with the Kansas City Monarchs of the American Association of Professional Baseball. Thorpe started 16 games for the Monarchs in 2022, pitching to an 8-2 record and 4.96 ERA with 75 strikeouts in 81.2 innings of work.

On 24 February 2023, Thorpe was released by Kansas City.

References

External links

1995 births
Living people
Australian expatriate baseball players in the United States
Chattanooga Lookouts players
Cedar Rapids Kernels players
Fort Myers Miracle players
Gulf Coast Twins players
Major League Baseball pitchers
Major League Baseball players from Australia
Melbourne Aces players
Minnesota Twins players
National baseball team players
Rochester Red Wings players
Sportspeople from Melbourne
St. Paul Saints players